Onassis Linda Mntambo (born 3 June 1989) is a South African professional soccer player who plays as a midfielder for Sekhukhune United. He has been capped once for the South African national team.

References

1989 births
Living people
South African soccer players
Roses United F.C. players
Jomo Cosmos F.C. players
Chippa United F.C. players
Orlando Pirates F.C. players
South African Premier Division players
National First Division players
South Africa international soccer players
Association football wingers
Soccer players from Johannesburg